Avra may refer to:

Places
Avra Valley, Arizona, U.S.
Avra Valley, Arizona, a populated place
Avra, Pima County, Arizona, a populated place
Marana Regional Airport, also known as Avra Valley Airport
Arbab Kandi, also known as Avra, a village in Ardabil Province, Iran
Avra, Kozani, in the Greek region of Macedonia
Aller, Devon, formerly known as Avra, England
Avra, Trikala, a settlement in the Trikala regional unit, Greece

People
Avra (singer), a Greek-Australian singer-songwriter, actress, record producer and fashion stylist
Avra M. Warren (1893–1957), United States Ambassador
Avra Theodoropoulou (1880–1963), Greek music teacher, and women's rights activist

Music
"Avra" (song), 2012 song by Ivi Adamou
Avra, 2001 album by Kroke

Other uses
Avra (spring water),  a Coca-Cola brand of spring water from Temeni, Greece
Avra, a fictional character in Green Lantern: Emerald Knights who is the "First Lantern"
Avra Laboratories, founded by A. V. Rama Rao, an Indian inventor and chemist

See also
Aura (disambiguation)